Adger may refer to:

Places
Adger, Alabama
Adger, South Carolina
Lake Adger, a mountain lake in Polk County, North Carolina

People
Adger (given name)
Adger (surname)

Other uses 
USS James Adger, a 1851 sidewheel steamer